Ashmansworth is a village and civil parish in the Basingstoke and Deane district of the English county of Hampshire.

Geography
The ridge overlooks Highclere Castle and Newbury, with views over large areas of Berkshire and North Hampshire. It lies within the North Wessex Downs Area of Outstanding Natural Beauty (AONB), and the area is popular with walkers, cyclists and horse riders.

The village is at the junction of five minor roads about 1 km west of the A343 between Newbury and Andover. Access has not always been as good as today.

The hamlet of Crux Easton lies around 1 mile south east from Ashmansworth.

History
St James' Church
St James' Church, Ashmansworth, is believed to have been built around the middle of the 12th century, to which date the nave belongs. The chancel dates from the end of the same century. Windows have been inserted at various dates and the east wall was rebuilt in 1745. Wall paintings, mainly discovered in the 1800s and early 1900s, depict the life of Jesus, and probably date from the 1200s to the 1600s. The village church is dedicated to Saint James the Great. It is now a Grade I listed building.

Origins of Ashmansworth

Excavations in Church Farm indicate part of the hamlet was occupied in the Iron Age. The hamlet is also located in close proximity to the Oxdrove prehistoric route.

Some Roman pottery fragments have also been discovered in Ashmansworth.

Ashmansworth was granted as part of Whitchurch to the church of Winchester, some time in the 10th Century. The first reference to Ashmansworth is in a charter dated 909, in which Edward the Elder returned the hamlet to the community. In 934, King Æthelstan (referring to the hamlet as ‘Aescmaeres’) directed that some of the land was to be put under the management of the bishop. It remained in possession of the bishopric until 1649.

Obadiah Sedgwick (and, from 1654, his son, Obadiah) was the lord of the manor from 1649 to the late 1600s, when it returned to the bishop. The manor was sold in 1802 to the Earl of Carnarvon.

19th Century

In 1811 a fire destroyed major parts of the village, along with parish records.

The population of Ashmansworth remained low during the 19th century. This was not helped by the restricted access to the land. A Black's Guide, published in 1871, described the village as being “among the least trodden districts and most secluded angles of the country, noteworthy only for its early English church”.

An independent Parish Council for Ashmansworth was founded in 1894. One of the first issues it addressed was the water supply. Throughout its history Ashmansworth experienced difficulties in maintaining an adequate supply of drinking water. Before the installation of piped water in the late 1930s, the only sources of drinking water for many villagers were Mere Pool and the 100 metres deep well at Church Farm.

20th Century

In 1901 a spokesman for the Archaeological Society described Ashmansworth as “a long scattered village, neglected and deserted in its aspect, with a rapidly decreasing population”. At this time the church had fallen into disrepair, probably as a result of it being subordinate to the East Woodhay parish.

Over the course of the 20th century the character of Ashmansworth changed rapidly, largely as a result of the intensive farming practices adopted after the Second World War.

The modern village has a central core, concentrated around the main thoroughfare where the Village Hall, built in 1952, village green, war memorial, former Plough Inn, former chapel and old school house are all located.

There are many key buildings in the village including eight listed buildings, some dating from the 18th century such as Plough Cottage and Pheasant Cottage.

Demography
According to the 2001 census, it had a population of 215.
According to the 2011 census, it had a population of 216.

Amenities
The village was served for many years by the local public house, The Plough, which ceased trading in 2008.

Notable residents
 Gerald Finzi, composer
 George Bissill, artist

References

External links

Ashmansworth Parish Council. Parish website containing information on the Parish Council and other aspects of the village.
 Hampshire Treasures: Volume 2 (Basingstoke and Deane) Pages 001, 003, 004, 005, and 006

Civil parishes in Basingstoke and Deane
Villages in Hampshire